Aatagallu is a 2018 Indian Telugu-language action thriller film produced by Vaasireddy Ravindra, Vaasireddy Sivaji, Vaddapudi Jithendra, and Makkina Ramu under the Friends Movie Creations banner. The film was directed by Paruchuri Murali. The film stars Jagapathi Babu, Nara Rohit, Darshana Banik in the lead roles  and music composed by Sai Karthik. Editing and Cinematography was handled by Marthand K. Venkatesh and Vijay C. Kumar respectively. The film was released on 24 August 2018.

Plot
The film begins with Siddharth a reputed filmmaker being accused of killing his wife, Anjali. But he declares himself as not guilty. Here, an undefeated criminal lawyer Veerendra is appointed as a prosecutor and he has all the evidence against Siddharth. However, as a rectitude, he believes that Siddharth is virtuous. So, he calls for a new investigation and uncovers Munna, Anjali's ex-lover, as the culprit, and acquits Siddharth. Soon after, a flabbergasted Veerendra discovers that Siddharth is indeed the culprit. Siddharth is proud and does not want his image tainted. Once, he had a clash with a farmer, Dharma Rao, who slaps him on the road. A enraged Siddharth knocked him out. The incident makes a severe impact on Anjali and she decides to divulge the truth, so, he slaughtered her too. Right now, Veerendra targets Siddharth and brings out his true identity. Finally, the movie ends with Siddharth's suicide.

Cast

Jagapathi Babu as Pubilc Prosector Veerendra
Nara Rohit as Siddharth
Darshana Banik as Anjali
Brahmanandam as Go Go
Subbaraju as DCP Nayak
Sritej as Munna
Chalapathi Rao as Tenali Naidu
Nagineedu as CM
Prabhu as Dharma Rao
Satyam Rajesh as Rajesh Kumar
Priya as Padma, Anjali's mother
Jeeva as Munna's father
Tulasi as Munna's mother
Pilla Prasad as Excise Minister
Chitti

Production 
The shooting of the film began on 11 October 2017 at Ramanaidu Studios, Hyderabad, Telangana, India, with the "first look" poster releasing on 11 May 2018. On 9 June 2018, a 67-second teaser was released, followed by  the first song, "Nee Valle," on 10 June from Red FM at Mango Music. Finally, the theatrical trailer was launched on 30 June 2018.

Soundtrack 

The music was composed by Sai Karthik and was released on Mango Music Company.

Reception
The Times of India rated 1.5/5, stating that “There's no reason why you should suffer.” Everyone got impressed with Nara Rohit’s acting, Jagapathi Babu’s stern & serious looks worked out good for him and Darshana Banik as Cameo. 123telugu.com rated 2.5/5, announcing Aatagallu–Same old murder mystery: The film has nothing new to offer, making it a routine and outdated watch. Whereas Mirchi-9 granted 1.25/5 stating it as  Playing with Audience Patience. Greatandhra.com declared 1/5 and named the film as "Totally Substandard". Telugu Mirchi accorded 2.75/5 professing "Aatagallu is an outdated, boring plot. Yet, interesting with gripping twists, but the director should not have revealed the twists so early.” Cine Josh affirmed the movie as a mindless film with countless negatives going with 2/5.

References

External links

2018 films
2010s Telugu-language films
2018 action thriller films
Indian action thriller films
Indian romantic thriller films
2010s romantic thriller films
Films scored by Sai Karthik